Enrico Albrigi (born 5 January 1943) is a retired Italian footballer. He played as forward.

References

1943 births
Living people
Footballers from Lombardy
Italian footballers
Association football forwards
Serie A players
Torino F.C. players
Hellas Verona F.C. players
Catania S.S.D. players
U.S. Livorno 1915 players